Martin Donnelly (born 4 January 1951) is a Northern Irish former football defender who played professionally in the North American Soccer League and Major Indoor Soccer League.

Career
Donnelly played in the North American Soccer League for the San Diego Sockers between 1979 and 1983, making 116 outdoor appearances. During his time with the Sockers, he also played three indoor seasons, two in the NASL and one, the 1982-1983 season, in the Major Indoor Soccer League. The Sockers won the MISL title that season. In May 1984, the Sockers sold Donnelly and Alan Mayer to the Las Vegas Americans for $150,000. When the Americans folded at the end of the season, Donnelly returned to San Diego where he worked briefly as a truck driver. In December 1985, he signed as a free agent for the Dallas Sidekicks.

References

1951 births
Living people
Association footballers from Belfast
Association footballers from Northern Ireland
League of Ireland players
League of Ireland XI players
Dallas Sidekicks (original MISL) players
Drogheda United F.C. players
Glenavon F.C. players
Kidderminster Harriers F.C. players
Las Vegas Americans players
Lisburn Distillery F.C. players
Major Indoor Soccer League (1978–1992) players
North American Soccer League (1968–1984) indoor players
North American Soccer League (1968–1984) players
Expatriate association footballers from Northern Ireland
Expatriate association footballers in the Republic of Ireland
Expatriate soccer players in the United States
San Diego Sockers (NASL) players
San Diego Sockers (original MISL) players
Northern Ireland amateur international footballers
Association football defenders